Plain of Reeds (in ) is an inland wetland in Vietnam's Mekong Delta. Most of the wetlands are within Long An Province and Đồng Tháp Province.

Physical characteristics

Đồng Tháp Mười is a "back swamp" forming a large inundated depression of highly acidic soil. Until the 1970s, only primitive floating rice could be grown in the area. It is similar to a very large swampy floodplain stretching along the Bassac River from Châu Đốc to the foot of the Takeo Plateau. It was around 1,000,000 hectares in the 18th century and is now half that size due to drainage. Within Đồng Tháp Mười the Tràm Chim National Park has been protected for the conservation of wetland ecosystems.

History
Pre-Angkor remains along the Vàm Cỏ indicate that the Vàm Cỏ originally connected with the main Mekong riverways at Dong Thap Muoi and would have formed the main route from Cambodia to the South China Sea. However, when the river silted up the Khmers abandoned the area.

Đồng Tháp Mười had served as a base for rebels and bandits throughout Vietnam's recent history. During the First Indochina War, the swamp frequently served as a base for the Viet Minh, though the French anticipated and prevented this on at least one occasion.

The area was used as a base by Ba Cụt.

During the Vietnam War the Plain covered an area of 2500 square miles across Kien Tuong, Kien Phong, Hậu Nghĩa, Long An and Định Tường Provinces and again served as a base for Vietcong forces. From 1–8 January 1966 U.S., Australian and Army of the Republic of Vietnam (ARVN) forces conducted Operation Marauder/Operation An Dan 564 in the area.

See also
Láng Sen Wetland Reserve

References

Base areas of the Viet Cong
Wetlands of Vietnam
Landforms of Long An province
Landforms of Đồng Tháp province